Haya Al Shuaibi  (born 2 January 1979  ) is a Kuwaiti comedian actress.

Personal life 
She married twice, had a son by the first, and a son and a daughter to the second husband.

References

1979 births
Living people
20th-century Kuwaiti actresses
21st-century Kuwaiti actresses
Kuwaiti television actresses
Kuwaiti stage actresses
Place of birth missing (living people)
People from Kuwait City